The Battle of Crooked River was a skirmish between Latter Day Saints forces and a Missouri state militia unit from southeast of Elmira, Missouri, in Ray County; the militia was under the command of Samuel Bogart. The battle was one of the principal points of conflict in the 1838 Missouri Mormon War. After the battle, the governor of Missouri issued Missouri Executive Order 44, sometimes called the "Extermination Order", which led to the expulsion of the Mormons from Missouri.

Background
During 1838 there was an escalation in tensions between the members of the Church of Jesus Christ of Latter Day Saints and their neighbors in northwestern Missouri. Ray County was located immediately south of the Mormon-dominated Caldwell County. The two counties were separated by a no-man's land 24 miles long and 6 miles wide, known as "Bunkham's Strip" or "Buncombe Strip". This unincorporated strip was attached to Ray County for administrative and military purposes.

The citizens of Ray County and their neighbors to the west in Clay County, first began to have concerns about the Mormons to the north when a group of "dissenters" from the church was expelled from Caldwell County. These dissenters, including David Whitmer, William Wines Phelps, John Whitmer and Oliver Cowdery, had been the leaders of the Latter Day Saint church in Missouri. They relocated their families to Richmond and Liberty, the county seats of Ray and Clay, respectively, and claimed that their lives had been threatened and their property had been stolen by the Mormons.

Conflicts between the Mormons and non-Mormons in Carroll County and Daviess County throughout the summer put settlers in the more settled counties of Ray and Clay increasingly on edge. This unease reached a bursting point when Thomas B. Marsh and Orson Hyde of the Mormon Quorum of the Twelve Apostles arrived in Richmond and reported that the Danites had invaded Daviess County and sacked the county seat of Gallatin. They also charged that a Mormon group known as the Danites planned to burn Richmond and Liberty to the ground. This testimony sent the worried citizens into a near frenzy. Women, children and property were ferried across the Missouri River for protection against an imminent Mormon invasion, and the state militia was put on alert. It was later discovered that the alert was ill-founded and caused by an anti-Mormon who was trying to create unease to turn the people against Mormons.

Prelude to the battle
General David R. Atchison of Clay County, commander of the state militia in northwestern Missouri, ordered a company led by Captain Samuel Bogart of Ray County to patrol Bunkham's Strip to "prevent, if possible, any invasion of Ray county by persons in arms whatever". According to Peter Burnett, a resident of Liberty, "Captain Bogart was not a very discreet man, and his men were of much the same character". Bogart had previously participated in a vigilante group that harried the Mormons in Carroll County.

Bogart and his party began visiting the homes of Latter Day Saints living in Bunkham's Strip, forcibly disarming them and ordering them to leave Ray County. Bogart penetrated into Caldwell County and began to similarly harass Mormons there, advising them to remove to Far West, Missouri, the county seat. Returning to Ray County, his men captured three Mormons — Nathan Pinkham, Jr., William Seely, and Addison Green.

Reports quickly made it to Far West to the effect that a "mob" had captured and intended to execute a group of Mormon prisoners. About midnight, an armed rescue party formed. David W. Patten led the contingent of Caldwell county militia. Patten had come to be known as "Captain Fear-not," for his bravery during the attacks in Daviess County. The Mormon force quickly moved south along the main road connecting Far West and Richmond.

The battle

On the night of October 24, 1838, Captain Bogart's unit had camped along the banks of Crooked River in Bunkham's Strip. Patten and the Mormon rescue company approached from the north along the main road, having traveled the 12 or so miles from Far West in the five hours since midnight. At daybreak on the 25th, the Mormons encountered the militia's sentries. A brief firefight ensued, with each side testifying that the other had fired first. One of the sentries, John Lockhart, shot Patrick O'Bannion, the Mormons' scout. O'Bannion later died from this wound. Lockhart and the other guards  fled down the hill to the militia camp which took up a defensive position.

The Mormon company approached the camp of the Ray militia and formed a battle line in three columns, led by David W. Patten, Charles C. Rich, and Patrick Durfee. Rich later recalled that soon after the Mormons had formed their lines, the militia "fired upon us with all their guns". A general firefight commenced, but the militia were situated behind the riverbank and held the tactically superior position. Patten decided to charge the militia position, shouting the Mormon battle cry of "God and Liberty!" The Missourians were without swords and so broke their lines and fled across the river in all directions. 

During his charge, Patten was shot and mortally wounded. Ebenezer Robinson recalled that Patten had been "brave to a fault, so much so that he was styled and called 'Captain Fearnought'". Although it was not immediately realized, Gideon Carter had also been killed, making a total of three Mormon fatalities and one militiaman fatality. The Mormons collected their wounded as well as the baggage which Bogart's unit had left in the camp and made their way back to Far West.

During the conflict, one of the militia men named Samuel Tarwater was injured by Parley P. Pratt. After Tarwater fell unconscious from the injury, D. Michael Quinn states the company of Danites "mutilated the unconscious Tarwater 'with their swords' striking him lengthwise in the mouth, cutting off his under teeth, and breaking his lower jaw; cutting off his cheeks ... and leaving him [for] dead."

Aftermath
The battle resulted in four fatalities and the mutilation of Samuel Tarwater. It served as a catalyst for a massive escalation of the Mormon War. Exaggerated reports of the Mormon incursion into Daviess County and of the battle (some claiming that half of Bogart's men had been lost) made their way to Missouri Governor Lilburn Boggs. He responded by issuing an executive order calling out 2,500 state militiamen to put down what he perceived to be open rebellion by the Mormons. Two days later, Governor Boggs issued an order that "the Mormons must be treated as enemies and must be exterminated or driven from the state" and directed the militia to carry this into effect. 

On October 30, a mob of approximately 200 men killed 17 men and boys at Haun's Mill. The next day, Joseph Smith and approximately 50 other church leaders were arrested. Most of these leaders were released within three weeks. In November, the rest were marched first to Independence, then to Richmond, and then to Liberty, where they were incarcerated in Liberty Jail. Joseph and Hyrum Smith were indicted by a grand jury on the charge of treason. They escaped while being transferred to Boone County.

In the end, the bulk of the membership of the church was forced to leave the state, being expelled by the governor's order.

See also
 Latter Day Saint martyrs

Notes

References
Baugh, Alexander L., A Call to Arms: The 1838 Mormon Defense of Northern Missouri, BYU Studies, 2000.
Document Containing the Correspondence, Orders &c. in Relation to the Disturbances with the Mormons; And the Evidence Given Before the Hon. Austin A. King, Judge of the Fifth Judicial Circuit of the State of Missouri, at the Court-House in Richmond, in a Criminal Court of Inquiry, Begun November 12, 1838, on the Trial of Joseph Smith, Jr., and Others, for High Treason and Other Crimes Against the State. Fayette, Missouri, 1841, complete text. 
 
Peck, Reed, The Reed Peck Manuscript, complete text.
Quinn, D. Michael, The Mormon Hierarchy: Origins of Power, pp. 99–100 Signature Books, 1994

External links
Mel Tungate's Battle of Crooked River sources website
Charles C. Rich's Account of the Battle

1838 Mormon War
Mormonism-related controversies
1838 in Missouri
Crooked River
October 1838 events